There were two regional elections held in the Community of Madrid in 2003:

Madrilenian regional election, May 2003
Madrilenian regional election, October 2003